Eupithecia russeola is a moth in the family Geometridae. It is found in northern Myanmar and northern Thailand.

The groundcolour of the forewings is orange-brown. The hindwings are much paler, with a dirty grey groundcolour.

References

Moths described in 1926
russeola
Moths of Asia